The House of One is a religious structure being built in Berlin. It will be the world's first house of prayer for three religions, containing a church, a mosque, and a synagogue.

It is to be built in Fischerinsel, on the site where the first church in Berlin, St Peter's, once stood. The laying of the foundation stone is scheduled for the 14th of April, 2020.

See also
Temple of All Religions
L'Opale d'Abraham (ou Le Dôme à Palabres). Christian Regaud: Editions La Bruyère, 2009 .
House of Religions

References

External links

The House of One

Proposed buildings and structures in Germany
Sacral architecture
Churches in Berlin
Mosques in Berlin
Synagogues in Berlin
Christianity and Islam
Christianity and Judaism
Islam and Judaism